Small Steps may refer to:

 Small Steps (novel), a novel by Louis Sachar
 Small Steps (album), an album by Heiruspecs
 Small Steps: The Year I Got Polio, a book by Peg Kehret

See also 
 Small Steps, Heavy Hooves, an album by Dear and the Headlights
 Small step semantics, in computer science